Heba Mohammed Al-Farra is a Libyan-born-Palestinian environmentalist who is based in Kuwait and is the founder of Women in Energy and Environment Organization.

In 2018, she was the East Asia winner of the Young Champions of the Earth award.

Early life 
Al-Farra was born in Libya to a Palestinian mother who is a medical doctor.

She grew up in the Gaza Strip, lacking sufficient running water or electricity.

Education 
Al-Farra obtained her bachelor's degree in environmental engineering from the University of Gaza in 2012.

She has a certificate in organisational management from Florida State University, and became a certified LEED Green Associate in 2017.

Career 
In 2018, Al-Farra worked at Enertech Management Consulting Company, as a Environmental Training and Development Specialist. Prior to that she was an Environmental Consultant at Enertech Holding Company and also at the Kuwait Scientific Center.

She is the founder of the Women in Energy and Environment Organization.

Award 
In 2018 she was a Young Champions of the Earth winner for East Asia for her efforts to encourage women to work in the sustainable energy sector.

Family life 
Al-Farra moved to Kuwait in 2012, where she lives with her husband and two sons.

References

External link 
 2017 Kuwait Times OpEd Climate change is a grand dilemma

Year of birth missing (living people)
Living people
Palestinian engineers
Women founders
Islamic University of Gaza alumni
Kuwaiti engineers
People from Gaza City
Florida State University alumni
21st-century Palestinian women